The following articles contain lists of television stations in Atlantic Canada:

 List of television stations in New Brunswick
 List of television stations in Prince Edward Island
 List of television stations in Nova Scotia
 List of television stations in Newfoundland and Labrador